Marcelinho is a diminutive form of the given name Marcelo, and may refer to:

Sports

Football
Marcelinho Carioca (born 1971), born Marcelo Pereira Surcin, Brazilian attacking midfielder
Marcelinho Paulista (born 1973), born Marcelo José de Souza, Brazilian manager and former midfielder
Marcelinho Paraíba (born 1975), born Marcelo dos Santos, Brazilian manager and former midfielder
Marcelinho (footballer, born February 1978), born Marcelo de Souza Ramos, Brazilian attacking midfielder
Marcelinho (footballer, born September 1978), born Marcelo Aguiar Quarterole, Brazilian manager and former striker
Marcelinho (footballer, born 1981), born Marcelo Santos Oliveira, Brazilian football attacking midfielder
Marcelinho (footballer, born 1983), Born Marcelo Luis de Almeida Carmo, Brazilian rightback
Marcelinho (footballer, born August 1984), born Marcelo Nascimento da Costa, Bulgarian attacking midfielder
Marcelinho (footballer, born September 1984), born Marcelo Oliveira da Silva, Brazilian striker
Marcelinho (footballer, born 1986), born Marcelo Roberto Lima de Mattos, Brazilian attacking midfielder
Marcelinho (footballer, born January 1987), born Marcelo Rodrigues, Brazilian forward
Marcelinho (footballer, born June 1987), born Marcelo Leite Pereira, Brazilian forward
Marcelinho (footballer, born 1990), born Marcelo Gil Fernando, Brazilian striker
Marcelinho (footballer, born 1994), born Marcelo Henrique França de Siqueira, Brazilian forward
Marcelinho (footballer, born 1996), born Marcelo Antônio de Oliveira, Brazilian winger
Marcelinho (footballer, born 2002), born Marcelo José de Lima Filho, Brazilian forward

Other sports
Marcelinho Elgarten (born 1974), born Marcelo Elgarten, Brazilian volleyball player
Marcelinho Huertas (born 1983), born Marcelo Tieppo Huertas, Brazilian basketball player
Marcelinho Machado (born 1985), born ''Marcelo Magalhães Machado", Brazilian basketball player

Arts and Entertainment
Marcelinho da Lua (born 1972), Brazilian singer and DJ

See also
Marcelo